La mamá del 10 is a Colombian telenovela produced by Caracol Televisión in 2018. The telenovela's plot revolves around numerous situations that a footballer goes through in order to become a professional player, and the sacrifices made by mothers to help their children fulfill these dreams. It stars Karent Hinestroza, Diego Vásquez, Antonio Jiménez, and Marcela Benjumea.

Plot 
This telenovela tells the story of Tina Manotas, a woman who lives in the Colombian Pacific who is forced to leave her hometown due to her economic conditions and moves to Colombia's capital, Bogotá. Upon arriving, her husband decides to leave her, and she struggles to cover the economic needs of her children.

However, Tina realizes that her youngest son, Víctor, has great potential in football and that he has a dream to become a professional player. As the years go by, Víctor manages to fulfill his dream due to his mother's unconditional support. Many years later, he fulfills the promise he made a long time ago, to buy an apartment in an exclusive part of the city. However, problems arise with their elitist neighbors, who are envious of the new luxurious life Tina has.

Cast 
 Karent Hinestroza as Tina Manotas
 Marcela Benjumea as Leonor Manrique
 Diego Vásquez as Coronel Agapito Dangond
 Antonio Jiménez as Edwin Toro
 Julio Pachón as Gustavo Guatibonza
 Laura Rodríguez as Policarpa "Polita" Toro
 Cristian Mosquera as Víctor Toro Manotas « Goldi
 Carolina López as Yamile Yesenia "Yuya" Urrego
 Yesenia Valencia as Lucellys Bermúdez
 Juan Pablo Barragán as Miguel Ángel Díaz
 Andrés Rojas as Fernando Rojas « Rojitas
 Jaisson Jeack as Florentino Bonilla
 Kristina Lilley as Eugenia Velasco
 Luis Eduardo Motoa as Clemente Velasco
 Víctor Hugo Morant as Vigilante
 Alejandro García as Juan Camilo León
 María Camila Porras as Diana Velasco
 Liliana Escobar as Profesora Silvana
 Pedro Palacio as Otoniel « La Culebra » Herrera
 Rafael Zea as Ramón
 Erick Cuéllar as Pereíta
 Ernesto Ballén as Junior Guatibonza « Guatí
 Julián Farietta as José Manuel
 Brian Moreno as Walter
 Lorena García as Verónica Velasco
 Luis Fernando Salas as « El Calidoso
 Diana Isabel Acevedo as Deris
 Julieth Arrieta as Eloísa
 María Irene Toro as Policarpa Amaya
 Martha Restrepo as Pilar
 Salvatore Cassandro as Nelson Casas

Adaptations 
Production of a new version of the telenovela for Mexican television, titled La jefa del campeón, was confirmed in April 2018, starring África Zavala.

Ratings

Episodes

References 

2018 telenovelas
2018 Colombian television series debuts
Colombian telenovelas
Spanish-language telenovelas
Caracol Televisión telenovelas
2018 Colombian television series endings
Television shows set in Colombia